Bob Island is a rocky island  long and  high, lying  southeast of Cape Errera, on Wiencke Island in the Palmer Archipelago. An island in this vicinity was surveyed and photographed by the Belgian Antarctic Expedition (BelgAE) under Gerlache in the year 1898. It was originally called "Ile Famine", but in the reports resulting from the expedition it was renamed "Ile Bob". In a survey of the area in 1955, the Falkland Islands Dependencies Survey (FIDS) made a landing on this island. Although it differs somewhat in size and position from the BelgAE reports, the FIDS found it closely resembles the BelgAE photograph and consider it to be the island originally named.

See also 
 List of Antarctic and sub-Antarctic islands

References 

Islands of the Palmer Archipelago